Coleophora comperta is a moth of the family Coleophoridae.

References

comperta
Moths described in 1992